La Savane (The Savannah), Op. 3, is a composition in the form of a ballade written for piano in 1846 by the American composer Louis Moreau Gottschalk. With the subtitle Ballade Créole, it was first published in 1849 by Gottschalk's publisher 'Escudiers' and again in 1850 by Editions Schott, with a dedication to Maria II of Portugal on the composer's assumption that a trip from Madrid to Lisbon during his concert tour in the spring of that year would be likely to happen.

Musical analysis
La Savane is a composition supposedly inspired by the local story that the skeletons of runaway slaves that had perished in the swamps around the city of New Orleans had in fact turned into oaks. It has an introductory melody which sounds pretty much like the folk tune Skip to My Lou, but that was actually based on portions of the Creole Louisiana song Lolotte or Pov'piti Lolotte. Written in the key of E-flat minor, it has 146 bars and an 84 bpm Andante tempo, mood marked as con malinconia.

References

External links

Compositions for solo piano
1846 compositions
Compositions by Louis Moreau Gottschalk
Piano compositions by American composers
Piano compositions in the Romantic era
Compositions in E-flat minor
Music with dedications